Mo' Money is a 1992 American comedy-drama film directed by Peter Macdonald, and written by Damon Wayans, who also starred in the film. The film co-stars Stacey Dash, Joe Santos, John Diehl, Harry Lennix, Bernie Mac (in his film debut), and Marlon Wayans. The film was released in the United States on July 24, 1992.

Plot
Ted Forrest (Richard E. Butler), who works for the Dynasty Club, is murdered by Keith Heading (John Diehl) and his men on the street. They switch a computer tape in Ted's car before police arrive.

Johnny Stewart (Damon Wayans) is a lifelong con man who performs scams with his younger brother Seymour (Marlon Wayans). When Johnny meets Amber Evans (Stacey Dash), he tries to impress her by obtaining an honest job at the company where she works—Dynasty Club, a credit card firm.

He becomes a mailroom clerk. Chris Fields (Mark Beltzman) trains Johnny how to do the job. Keith threatens Chris in the men's restroom, terrifying Chris. Johnny realizes that he needs money to woo Amber. He develops a scheme to commit identity theft with the credit card information of deceased cardholders to which he has access due to his mailroom position. He justifies his actions because he knows that he is stealing from only the company and not harming the individual cardholders.

Lieutenant Walsh (Joe Santos), who was once the partner of Johnny's deceased father, asks Chris questions about Keith. Chris is stabbed and killed by Keith's hitman in the subway station. Lt. Walsh investigates Chris's murder and find credit card receipts on him. Keith promotes Johnny from mailroom clerk to supervisor to replace Chris.

With Seymour's help, Johnny charges large amounts of money to the cards with the intention of impressing Amber. Keith is head of security at Dynasty Club, and he also runs a virtual stolen credit card operation. He records Johnny stealing a returned credit card and pressures him to join the credit card criminal enterprise.

Seymour takes a stolen credit card and attempts to buy a four-fingered ring. However, a security alarm blares, indicating the stolen card. Seymour tries to escape but is caught by mall security and questioned by police.

The police authorize a sting operation on Seymour to record Keith's conversation and to capture him. Lt. Walsh becomes furious about the operation. Keith's hitman tries to kill Johnny for blackmail until he shoots Walsh in the arm. Keith kidnaps Seymour, and Johnny goes after him until he escapes. Keith tries to kill Johnny by shooting him in the shoulder. A fight ensues between them until Johnny kills him by hanging him. Seymour and Amber visit Johnny lying in the hospital bed injured and decide to settle down.

Cast
Damon Wayans as Johnny Stewart / Anton Jackson / Blaine Edwards (cameo)
Stacey Dash as Amber Evans
Joe Santos as Lt. Raymond Walsh
John Diehl as Keith Heading
Bernie Mac as Club Doorman
Harry J. Lennix as Tom Dilton
Marlon Wayans as Seymour Stewart
Mark Beltzman as Chris Fields
Quincy Wong as Eddie
Kevin Casey as Lloyd
Larry Brandenburg as Businessman
Garfield as Rock
Alma Yvonne as Charlotte
Richard E. Butler as Ted Forrest
Matt Doherty as Kid
Evan Lionel Smith as Detective Mills
Rondi Reed as District Attorney

Production
The movie was filmed in Chicago, Illinois in 64 days from July 16 to September 18, 1991.

Reception
The film had a mostly negative reception. Michael Wilmington of the Los Angeles Times recalled that "there are amusing things in 'Mo’ Money'—the chemistry of the Wayans team, the paterfamilias routine of Joe Santos as a good cop, the piquant sexiness of Stacey Dash—but they get steamrollered by all the high-tech crash-bang movie machismo." Hal Hinson wrote in The Washington Post that Wayans, "the 'In Living Color' star, who wrote and executive-produced this new picture, has a handful of these sublimely blank moments in 'Mo' Money,' but not nearly enough to anesthetize us to the film's painful deficiencies." The New York Times''' Janet Maslin wrote that "the film would have been helped by more directorial spark than is supplied by Peter MacDonald, who is effectively stumped by the screenplay's split personality. Some of the material is played as comedy [...] but a lot of the film hinges on some intrigue involving a corporate swindle, and neither the scheme nor the villains are compelling." The film received a slightly more favorable review from Variety, which stated that the "loosely structured film has trouble meshing its very funny gag scenes with rough action footage, but it should earn mucho change from escapist fans." It holds a 16% approval rating on Rotten Tomatoes based on 25 reviews, with an average rating of 4.2/10. The website's critics consensus reads: "Mo' Money'' only comes with mo' problems in this comedically bankrupt outing from the Wayans brothers."

Box office

The film debuted at No. 1 at the box office in the United States, grossing $12,385,415 during its opening weekend. It ultimately finished with $40,227,006 at the North American box office. The film was released in the United Kingdom on December 18, 1992, and opened on #5.

Home media
DVD was released in Region 1 in the United States on January 1, 2002, and also Region 2 in the United Kingdom on 17 June 2002, it was distributed by Columbia TriStar Home Entertainment.

See also
Mo' Money (soundtrack)

References

External links

1992 films
1990s crime comedy films
African-American comedy films
American crime comedy films
American romantic comedy films
Columbia Pictures films
1990s English-language films
Films about organized crime in the United States
Films directed by Peter MacDonald
Films set in Chicago
Films shot in Chicago
1992 comedy films
Romantic crime films
1990s American films